Love in the Snow (German: Liebe im Schnee) is a 1929 German silent film directed by Max Obal and Rudolf Walther-Fein and starring Livio Pavanelli, Maria Paudler and Georg Alexander.

The art direction was by Botho Hoefer and Hans Minzloff.

Cast
 Livio Pavanelli as Dr. Reißner  
 Maria Paudler as Hella, seine Gattin  
 Georg Alexander as Dr. Gonter  
 Iwa Wanja as Snucks, ein Skihaserl  
 Jakob Tiedtke as Reynold, Großkaufmann 
 Steffie Vida

References

Bibliography
 Hans-Michael Bock and Tim Bergfelder. The Concise Cinegraph: An Encyclopedia of German Cinema. Berghahn Books, 2009.

External links

1929 films
Films of the Weimar Republic
Films directed by Rudolf Walther-Fein
Films directed by Max Obal
Films set in the Alps
German silent feature films
Skiing films
German black-and-white films